Olivier Sorlin (born 9 April 1979) is a French former professional footballer who played as a midfielder. He spent most of his career playing in France.

Career
Sorlin was born in Saint-Étienne, Loire.

Out of favour during his sixth season with Stade Rennais F.C., he took the opportunity to play abroad, and transferred to PAOK FC in January 2009. Following a very successful six-month loan, Sorlin signed a new two-year contract with the club in June 2009, after PAOK came to terms with Rennes.

On 29 August 2010, after the first game of the 2010–11 season, Sorlin suddenly asked for his contract to be broken so he could leave the club, citing that major family problems required him to return to France. According to his agent, Sorlin had already made some contacts with Evian, competing in Ligue 2, to continue his career in France.

Honours
Montpellier
UEFA Intertoto Cup: 1999

References

=External links
 
 
 

1979 births
Living people
Footballers from Saint-Étienne
French footballers
Association football midfielders
France under-21 international footballers
AS Saint-Étienne players
AS Montferrand Football players
ASOA Valence players
Montpellier HSC players
Stade Rennais F.C. players
AS Monaco FC players
Thonon Evian Grand Genève F.C. players
PAOK FC players
Ligue 1 players
Ligue 2 players
Super League Greece players
French expatriate footballers
French expatriate sportspeople in Greece
Expatriate footballers in Greece